ETR may refer to:
 East Turkestan Republic (disambiguation); first and second movements
 Express Toll Route, in Canada; Ontario Highway 407
 Entergy Corporation; NYSE stock symbol
 Edolo language; ISO language code
 Etravirine, a drug used to suppress HIV replication

Transportation
 ElettroTreno, a series of Italian high-speed trains
 Echigo Tokimeki Railway, a railway operating company in Japan
 Santa Rosa International Airport, serving Machala, Ecuador
 Essex Terminal Railway, a short line railroad in Canada

See also
 Xetra (trading system); XETR
 Eastern Test Range, a rocket testing area off of Cape Canaveral; ER or AFETR